This is a partial list of Royal Academicians (Post-nominal: RA), academicians of the Royal Academy of Arts in London. A full list is available on the web pages of the Royal Academy Collections.

See also

References

Royal Academicians
Royal Academicians